The Chery Wujie Pro (奇瑞 无界Pro) is an all-electric car that is manufactured by the NEV division of Chinese manufacturer Chery. The car is released under the iCar Ecosystem product series.

Overview

A second trim level with a maximum output of 70 kW and maximum torque of 120 Nm with the top speed of 125 km/hr and driving range of 408 km is also available. At the time of the launch, the price of the Chery Wujie Pro was from 79,990 yuan to 101,900 yuan (from $11,842 to $15,086), including subsidies for new energy vehicles in China. DC fast charging for the Chery Wujie Pro refills the battery from 30% to 80% state of charge within 30 minutes. 

The interior of the Wujie Pro features a 12.9-inch landscape screen and a 7.0-inch digital instrument panel. The Chery Wujie Pro is powered by a 3rd-gen Qualcomm 6155 chip built for automobiles, which enables a 540-degree panoramic view of the surrounding, meaning that a 360-degree picture and 180-degree of the front could be combined.

Notes

References

External links

Production electric cars
Wujie Pro
Cars introduced in 2022
Cars of China